Andronika Arianiti, also known as Donika Kastrioti,  (born 1428 – died 1506) was an Albanian noblewoman and the spouse of Albanian leader Skanderbeg (born Gjergj Kastrioti). She was the daughter of Gjergj Arianiti, an earlier leader in the ongoing revolt against the Ottomans.

Life

Donika was born in Kaninë, in 1428. Her father, Gjergj Arianiti was  a member of the Arianiti family whose domain stretched across the Shkumbin valley and the old Via Egnatia road and reached to the east today's Bitola. Her mother, Maria Muzaka was a member of the Muzaka family whose domain was the Myzeqe region.

A month after the Treaty of Gaeta, on 21 April 1451, Skanderbeg married Donika, and thus strengthened the ties with the Arianiti family, in the Eastern Orthodox Ardenica Monastery, in Lushnje, present-day southwestern Albania. Later her sister Angelina married Serbian ruler Stefan Branković. She is venerated as a saint in the Serbian Orthodox Church.

After the Ottoman conquest of Albania, the Kastriotis were given peerage in the Kingdom of Naples. They obtained a feudal domain, the Duchy of San Pietro in Galatina and the County of Soleto (Province of Lecce, Italy). Gjon Kastrioti II, Donika's and Skanderbeg's only child, married Jerina Branković, the daughter of Lazar Branković, Despot of Serbia.

Donika had a close friendship with the second wife of King Ferdinand I of Naples, Joanna of Aragon who is also the sister of Ferdinand of Aragon. After the beginning of the Italian War of 1494–1498, Donika was forced to leave Naples and arrived in Valencia around 1501 along with her grandchild, Alonso Kastrioti. They found refuge in the royal palace.

Notes

References 

15th-century Albanian people
15th-century women
Donika
Albanian Christians
Eastern Orthodox Christians from Albania
1428 births
Year of death missing
People from Vlorë
D